Hitterdalen is a village in the municipality of Røros in Trøndelag county, Norway. The village is located on the road between the town of Røros and the village of Brekken, about half way between the two places. Hitterdal Chapel is located in the village.

References

Røros
Villages in Trøndelag